Peter Levathes (28 July 1911 – 9 January 2002) was an American film and advertising executive, best known for briefly running 20th Century Fox.

Biography
Levathes was born in Pittsburgh and grew up in Washington. He attended Harvard University and studied law at Georgetown University. joined Fox in 1937 as legal assistant to Spyros Skouras, president of the company. During World War II he was a special agent with the FBI in Brazil, helping survey German military operations in Latin American.

From 1945–52 he led the Fox news and television production departments. He helped put together the documentary Crusade in Europe, worked as a television consultant to Citizens for Eisenhower in 1952, then as vice president in change of media and television for advertising agency Young & Rubicam for eight years.

Production Chief at Fox
He left advertising in 1959 to run Fox's television division. In May 1961 he was appointed head of production, replacing Robert Goldstein, who had been doing the job since the death of Buddy Adler.

Among Levathes main actions at Fox were:
signing Irwin Allen to a three-picture contract
signing Rod Taylor to a deal for films and television
purchasing the rights to Doctor Dolittle

In March 1962 Levathes announced Fox would make 14 films from a possible 17 including:
two unnamed productions from Darryl F. Zanuck
Gideon Goes to War from Mark Robson
Something's Got to Give starring Marilyn Monroe
The Story of General Patton
The Jungle from the novel by James Michener
First Love from the play based on the Romain Gary novel
The Enemy Within based on the book by Robert F. Kennedy produced by Jerry Wald
Celebration based on the play by William Inge produced by Wald
Ulysses based on the novel by James Joyce produced by Wald
Take Her She's Mine based on the hit play
The Battle of Leyte Gulf
Happily Ever After based on the story by Vera Caspry
Drink to Me Only by Ira Wallack and Abram S. Giness
Evil Come, Evil Go a suspense story starring Pat Boone
Love in a Cool Climate based on novel by Frederick Kohner to star Ann-Margret and Pamela Tiffin
Five Weeks in a Balloon based on novel by Jules Verne

Levathes cancelled Something's Got to Give during production. Later that month his champion, Spyrous Skouras, was forced to retire. Daryl F. Zanuck returned as president and Levathes resigned from his position in August, becoming head of television. Ulysses, Promise at Dawn and Take Her, She's Mine were all postponed.

He was fired from Fox in 1962, then returned to advertising.

Films made/developed under Levathes at Fox
Five Weeks in a Balloon (1962)
Tender Is the Night (1962)
Cleopatra (1963)
Something's Got to Give (1963) (abandoned)

Films purchased but made under different regime
The Sound of Music (1965)

Films announced but not made
A Summer World (1962) – postponed
The Greatest Story Ever Told – studio passed on project, which was made by United Artists
Big River, Big Man

References

External links

 Ilias Chrissochoidis (ed.), The Cleopatra Files: Selected Documents from the Spyros P. Skouras Archive (Stanford, 2013).

American business executives
20th Century Studios people
1911 births
2002 deaths